The following is a list of characters from Sons of Anarchy, and its spin-off Mayans M.C. Both are American crime drama television series created by Kurt Sutter. Sons of Anarchy aired from 2008 to 2014, Mayans M.C. since 2018.

Cast
  = Main cast (credited) 
  = Recurring cast (3+)
  = Guest cast (1-2)

Main cast

Recurring cast

Guest cast

Lead characters

Jax Teller

Jackson Nathaniel 'Jax' Teller (Charlie Hunnam), is a member of the titular motorcycle club and the main protagonist of the series. He spends the majority of the show's lifespan as the vice president of the Sons of Anarchy Motorcycle Club's Redwood Original (SAMCRO) mother charter based in Charming, California; following season four, he assumes the presidency for the remainder of the series.

Ezekiel Reyes 

Ezekiel 'E.Z.' Reyes (J. D. Pardo) is the protagonist on the FX television series Mayans M.C.. A member of the titular motorcycle club, he is a Prospect for the majority of the first two seasons of the series. The brother of club member Angel Reyes, E.Z. becomes a full patch member by the end of the second season. E.Z. also has an eidetic memory, and can vividly remember childhood memories. Pardo had to go through a transformation for the role, including gaining muscle.

Main characters

Sons of Anarchy

Gemma Teller-Morrow 

Gemma Teller-Morrow (Katey Sagal) is the queen of Charming under Clay's rule and also the main female character from the show. A Machiavellian schemer and expert in psychological manipulation, Gemma is the wife of Clay Morrow, the widow of John Teller and mother of Jax Teller. Gemma also made a guest appearance in Mayans M.C..

Bobby Munson 

Robert 'Bobby Elvis' Munson (Mark Boone Junior) is the treasury secretary of SAMCRO. He later becomes vice president when Jax takes over as president. Bobby is intelligent and even-tempered (an uncommon trait among his club-mates), but unafraid of using violence when necessary. Munson's father was an accountant in Reno, Nevada, and kept two sets of books for the Mafia. Bobby apparently learned accounting from him. He is Jewish and does Elvis Presley impersonations in Lake Tahoe, leading to him sometimes being referred to as "Bobby Elvis". He is the Treasurer Secretary of the Sons of Anarchy Motorcycle Club's Charming, California chapter. This means that he is responsible for all of the club's financial matters and record keeping. As one of the club's calmer members, he frequently finds himself having to try to calm tensions among his brothers, particularly during Season 2. It was revealed by Juice Ortiz in season 6 that Bobby started out in the SOA Nomad charter, presumably after prospecting for the SOA Reno Chapter.

He is murdered by August Marks after being taken hostage and having his eye cut out and fingers cut off and delivered to Jax. He is a victim of Gemma's lies about how Tara died.

Tig Trager 

Alexander 'Tig' Trager (Kim Coates) is the Vice President and former Sergeant-at-Arms of the Sons of Anarchy Motorcycle Club's Charming, California charter and is the club's most violent member. During the first four seasons of the show, he wore the "Sgt. at Arms" patch on his cut and after season seven, he wears the "V. President" patch. He is extremely loyal to Clay Morrow, the club's president, Clay's wife Gemma, and the club itself. He has at times had a strained relationship with the then Vice President Jax Teller, arising from Trager's use of violence in situations which may not call for it.

Not much is mentioned about Trager's past, but it is likely that he is a native of Charming and that he has served time in prison. It is explained in a behind-the-scenes video from Season One that he was a U.S. Marine. He is in his late 40s or early 50s and was the Sergeant-at-Arms of the Sons of Anarchy Motorcycle Club's Mother Charter, the responsibilities of which include: to ensure proper employment, defense, and enforcement of club rules, charter bylaws, and charter decrees, and imposition of penalties for violations thereof are observed, executed, and fulfilled. His "day job" is working as a mechanic at the Teller-Morrow Automotive Repair shop, and he is often used by the gang to carry out killings. He has two daughters, named Dawn and Fawn, whom he sees a couple of times each year. He suffers from acute pediophobia, a fear of dolls, which Sons of Anarchy creator Kurt Sutter actually has. In the Season One episode "Old Bones", he explicitly says that he is a necrophiliac, and describes to Clay what he likes about it, while at the morgue. It remains unclear whether Tig was being serious, or simply used the opportunity to enhance his reputation for embracing the gruesome and the macabre. Several times he is hinted to have a proclivity for other paraphilias. Despite a perhaps depraved love of violence, Tig also shows sensitivity when it comes to women, children, and animals, taking revenge against those who exploit them. In season 5, Tig becomes a pet owner after rescuing an American Pit Bull Terrier who lost her fight, from being shot. Tig is frequently employed in situations where the use of violence is needed.  Far from shying away, Tig actually seems to enjoy and covet his position as an enforcer, relishing the art of dirty fighting and the use of sudden, vicious, and often extreme violence. A trademark tactic is for him to bite off a piece of flesh from a rival during a fight..

Chibs Telford 

Filip 'Chibs' Telford (Tommy Flanagan), succeeded Jackson "Jax" Teller as SAMCRO president after stints as vice president and sergeant at arms. Chibs was born in Scotland and grew up in Belfast, Northern Ireland. He is a former member of the Real IRA and Sons of Anarchy's Belfast charter, aka SAMBEL. He is the club member to have held the most positions. On his colors, he wore the following patches: "Sgt. at Arms", "V. President", "Sons of Anarchy" and like Jax, the "In Memory of Opie" patch. Chibs is extremely loyal to Jax Teller and the club; he also has a good relationship with Tig Trager, Half-Sack Epps (a prospect he sponsored), and Juice Ortiz, with whom he has a fatherlike relationship, which ends after Juice's eventual betrayal of the club.

Chibs is SAMCRO's connection with the IRA, which sells guns to organized crime groups within the United States. He is originally from Glasgow, Scotland, but grew up in Belfast, Northern Ireland and is heard speaking  Scottish Gaelic. As he tells IRA member Cameron Hayes, whom he patches up after Cameron is shot, Chibs served as a medic with the British Army for five months before being court-martialed.

Chibs was excommunicated from the IRA by the group's leader, Jimmy O'Phelan, who out of jealousy scarred Chibs' face, told him never to return to Ireland, stole Chibs' wife Fiona Larkin (who, as shown in Season 2 remains married to and still loves, but is estranged from Chibs), and raised Chibs and Fiona's daughter, Kerrianne.  Chibs then joined SAMBEL in Ireland until he transferred to SAMCRO in the United States, whose Charming charter has Real IRA links via the club's Belfast charter.

Chibs also appears in Mayans M.C..

Half-Sack Epps 

Edward Kip 'Half-Sack' Epps (whom Cherry calls Kip and Tig sometimes calls Kippy) (Johnny Lewis) is nicknamed Half-Sack because he lost his right testicle in the Iraq War. He is a prospect in seasons 1–2, tasked with doing all menial jobs SAMCRO members don't want to do. He's not overly bright (he stores a bloody deer's head under the club's pool table with the intention of mounting it on the wall, but doesn't understand when Jax says it has to be stuffed). He's loyal, brave, obedient, and earns Jax's trust. Half-Sack is a lightweight boxing champion, and in season 1 the club earns money from purses and bets on Half-Sack in order to buy guns from the Irish.

Kip Epps served in the United States Army during the Iraq War. He lost a testicle while serving in Iraq, prompting the nickname "Half Sack". A surprisingly formidable fighter, he was also the Junior Lightweight Champion of the Armed Forces boxing competition. After leaving the military, he began prospecting for the Sons of Anarchy Motorcycle Club and worked as a mechanic at Teller-Morrow Automotive Repair. He is also a vegetarian.

Tara Knowles-Teller 

Dr. Tara Knowles-Teller (Maggie Siff) is Jax's main love interest. She moves back to Charming shortly before the events of the series. In Season 5, Jax and Tara become husband and wife. She is also the mother of his son Thomas and stepmother to Abel.

Clay Morrow 

Clarence 'Clay' Morrow (Ron Perlman) is a First 9 member of SAMCRO. He starts off the series as president. He is the stepfather to Jax Teller and the second husband to Gemma. His actions throughout the series have severe effects on both the club and his family.

Opie Winston 

Harry 'Opie' Winston (Ryan Hurst) is the son of SAMCRO co-founder Piney, and the best friend of Jax Teller since childhood. Opie's mother took him away from Piney and Charming when he was 16, but he left her and returned to his father and the club. While married to Donna, Opie is sent to prison for five years after being caught by police when his getaway driver (Kyle Hobart) abandoned him at a crime scene, thus leaving Opie's wife and two children, Ellie and Kenny, to fend for themselves during his incarceration. Upon his release, Opie's family has difficulty making ends meet, which contributes to Opie's decision to resume illegal activity with SAMCRO, against Donna's wishes. After Donna is murdered, Lyla forms a relationship with Opie, who ultimately marries her. Opie purposely gets himself sent back to prison to help protect Jax and sacrifices himself when Pope wants one of the Sons dead. He is given a final farewell in the clubhouse with all of SAMCRO honouring him.

Piney Winston 

Piermont 'Piney' Winston (William Lucking) co-founded SAMCRO, and was the club's first vice president. He is the father of Opie, was a Vietnam veteran, and must carry an oxygen tank due to emphysema. His patches have included: First 9, Redwood and Original.

Winston was in his late 60s and served as a Soldier in the U.S. Army 25th Infantry Division during the Vietnam War. When he returned to his hometown of Charming, California, in 1967, he felt ostracized by the same society he had just risked his life for. He eventually co-founded the Sons of Anarchy Motorcycle Club with fellow war veteran John Teller as a form of social rebellion and freedom. He was JT's vice president until he was diagnosed with emphysema in 1991. He then suffered from severe emphysema and had to carry an oxygen tank with him at all times, which prevent his going out on runs, but he still attended "Church". Piney’s emphysema is implied to have been caused by years of smoking, and he is often seen holding and smelling unlit cigarettes during sit-downs. Despite his age he proved to be just as tough as his younger club brothers. Piney is the father of Harry "Opie" Winston, Jax Teller's best friend and another member of the Sons of Anarchy. Piney was the only contemporary SAMCRO (Sons of Anarchy Motorcycle Club Redwood Original) member to wear the original Sons of Anarchy denim kutte. He is a heavy drinker, even more so than the other club members, with his preferred liquor being Patrón.

Juice Ortiz 

Juan-Carlos 'Juice' Ortiz (Theo Rossi) is SAMCRO's hacker and intelligence officer. Though Juice displays great technical prowess in some respects, he has also proven to be somewhat simple minded when it comes to other tasks, often garnering him hazing from the other members. His storyline grows after law enforcement see him as the Club's weak link; in seasons 5-6 the Club becomes aware of his betrayals. On his colours, he wears the "Men of Mayhem" patch. He is one of three characters killed in the series' penultimate episode, "Red Rose," along with Wayne Unser and Gemma Teller Morrow.

Ortiz is of Puerto Rican and African-American descent, and is from Queens, New York. Ortiz's sponsor was Jax Teller (Season 2). He was seen as unreliable by Clay Morrow, and is often given menial tasks, such as driving the transport truck. He sports a short mohawk and has matching tribal designs tattooed on each side of his head. According to Gemma Teller Morrow, Ortiz has a sister in Queens, although their relationship seems to be very distant. 

He is a young and relatively new member of SAMCRO; he is close with Chibs Telford and Tig Trager, and it's suggested that he was sponsored by Jax as a prospect.

He develops depression and anxiety which results in a suicide attempt.

Wayne Unser 

Chief Wayne Unser (Dayton Callie) is the chief of the Charming Police Department. He also owns Unser Shipping trucking company, and is not above using the SOA for protection and other questionable activities related to his business. He is an ally of Clay Morrow, as well as a USMC Veteran of the Vietnam War.

Despite serving as chief of police, Unser's ties to SAMCRO tighten over the course of the series. This is most evident when he helps the club to kill corrupt ATF Agent June Stahl and club nemesis Jimmy O'Phalen. Unser is ousted as Chief of Police when the city decides to let the county sheriffs take over policing duties. Unser eventually grows very close with the Teller family and SAMCRO, frequently intervening in problems to find acceptable solutions and helping prevent infighting among members. Unser ends up retiring, but due to the expenses of his cancer treatment is forced to sell his house and business, and moves into a trailer. Ever since, he is often seen helping the Teller family in many tasks. He also uses his connections to aid the club in avoiding law enforcement investigations and gang warfare.

Conflicting loyalties within the Teller family and the club eventually convince Unser to rejoin law enforcement as an ad hoc investigator for Lt. Althea Jarry of the San Joaquin County Sheriffs Department. Unser goes to these extreme measures in hopes of finally stopping all the bloodshed the club is causing and suffering from. In the penultimate episode of the series, Jax Teller kills Wayne while he is trying to arrest Gemma Teller-Morrow (to prevent her son Jax from killing her).

Wendy Case 

Wendy Case (Drea de Matteo) is Jax Teller's ex-wife and Abel Teller's biological mother. Shortly after Jax breaks up with her, she intentionally becomes pregnant in the hope that it would keep Jax with her. She was a meth addict during her pregnancy, which nearly killed Abel who was born ten weeks premature with a hereditary heart malfunction and a tear in his abdominal wall.

Drea de Matteo is a supporting cast member for the majority of her time on the series. She was promoted to main cast billing for the seventh and last season.

Happy Lowman 
Happy 'Hap' Lowman (David LaBrava) is SAMCRO's Sergeant-at-Arms beginning in Season 6. His birth name is Happy and he gets a happy face tattoo every time he does a hit or kill for the club.

Happy also appears in Mayans M.C., a spin-off of Sons of Anarchy.

Ratboy Skogstrom 
George 'Ratboy' Skogstrom (Niko Nicotera) is originally introduced as a prospect during Season 4. He becomes a patched member and is often entrusted to look after Gemma and the other women.

Nero Padilla 
Neron 'Nero' Padilla (Jimmy Smits) is a Mexican-American pimp (who refers to himself as a "companionator") and the head of a Mexican gang known as the Byz Lats. In the Season 5 premiere, he is shown to have bonded with Gemma Teller. In "Authority Vested", he provides sanctuary to the Sons, who hide out at his brothel, Diosa, when SAMCRO is under attack and planning their next move. Over the next few episodes, Nero forms an alliance with Jax Teller and offers mentorly advice, such as how to deal with Gemma (in "Toad's Wild Ride"). Nero has a young son who is disabled and lives in a home.

Mayans M.C.

Mayans M.C. takes place in the same fictional universe as Sons of Anarchy and deals with the Sons' rivals-turned-allies then rivals once again, the Mayans Motorcycle Club.

Angel Reyes

Angel Reyes (Clayton Cardenas), is EZ's brother and Él Secretario of the Mayans, Santo Padre Charter.

Emily Thomas

Emily Thomas (Sarah Bolger), is the childhood sweetheart of EZ, who is now married to Miguel Galindo, and the mother of their infant son.

Bishop Losa
Obispo 'Bishop' Losa (Michael Irby), is president of the Mayan's Santo Padre Charter.

Adelita
Adelita (Carla Baratta), who as a child, watched her family die at the hands of the Galindo cartel.

Johnny Cruz
Johnny 'El Coco' Cruz (Richard Cabral) is a full patch member of Mayans M.C.

Gilberto Lopez
Gilberto 'Gilly' Lopez (Vincent “Rocco” Vargas), A former U.S. Army Ranger, good-natured Mixed martial arts fighter, and a full patch member of Mayans M.C., Santo Padre Charter

Taza Romero
Che 'Taza' Romero (Raoul Trujillo), Vice Presidente of Mayans M.C., Santo Padre Charter.

Neron Vargas
Neron 'Creeper' Vargas (Joseph Lucero) a full patch member of Mayans M.C. and "Road Captain" of the Santo Padre Charter.

Riz Ariza
Michael 'Riz' Ariza (Antonio Jaramillo) is a full patch member of Mayans M.C.

Miguel Galindo
Miguel Galindo (Danny Pino) is the son of Galindo Cartel founder Jose Galindo, and is the illegitimate son of Felipe, making him a half-brother to Ezekiel and Angel Reyes.

Felipe Reyes
Felipe Reyes (Edward James Olmos) is the once-strong Mexican patriarch and Angel and EZ's father.

Marcus Álvarez
Marcus Álvarez (Emilio Rivera) is the president of the Mayans Motorcycle Club, an Oakland-based rival motorcycle club that has allied itself with the Nords in order to break SAMCRO's iron-fisted control over Charming. He and the Mayans are bitter rivals with the Niners gang.

Álvarez, who is of Mexican descent, seems to be the Mayans national president. His son, Esai, was also a member of the club but had a hit placed on him by Marcus in 2008 as punishment for failing his mission. Most of his, and his gang's, income is made through dealing heroin and methamphetamine, and prostitution. For some time, he was a prisoner in Chino, but was released some time before the beginning of Season 1 of Sons of Anarchy.

On his colors, he wears patches reading "Los Asesinos de Dios" (Spanish for "God's Assassins") and "Mayans Oakland". However, his "President" patch is later changed to "El Padrino". He also has the Mayan Calendar tattooed on his chest.

Gabriela 'Gaby' Castillo
Gabriela 'Gaby' Castillo (Sulem Calderon) newly immigrated to the U.S. from Oaxaca, Mexico, she seeks to build a brighter future for herself and her family. After moving to Santo Padre, she starts a relationship with EZ until she leaves for Lodi to attend nursing school.

Leticia Cruz
Leticia Cruz (Emily Tosta) is Coco's daughter who was raised by her grandmother Celia for most of her life believing she was his younger sister.

Recurring

Sons of Anarchy

SAMCRO members

Orlin West 
Orlin West a.k.a. "West" (Douglas Bennett) is one of the three Sons Bobby recruited into the Redwood Original Charter in Season 6. He was killed at the port warehouse by Lin's men in season 7 while guarding the guns the Sons had stolen from Lin.

Go-Go 
'Go-Go' (Chris Browning), a Nomad who comes to Charming, appears in Season 5 and is voted into the club when the Nomad charter closes. He, Frankie, and Greg the Peg are working for Clay and are behind the break-ins and attacks. GoGo is killed by Unser with a double-barrel shotgun when he and Greg the Peg go to kill Unser, unaware that Clay is there and has double-crossed them.

Greg the Peg 
Greg 'The Peg' (Kurt Yaeger) is a Nomad who is missing a leg. He appears in Season 5, when he and two other Nomads – Frankie, and GoGo – come to Charming when the Nomad chapter closes, and are voted into SAMCRO. Greg, Frankie, and GoGo are working for Clay and are behind the home invasion attacks. Clay kills Greg by shooting him in the head, when Greg and GoGo attempt to kill Unser, unaware that Clay is there and has double-crossed them.

Frankie Diamonds 
Frankie 'Diamonds' (Chuck Zito), a New York Nomad who comes to Charming, appears in Season 5 and is voted into the club when the Nomad charter closes. He, GoGo, and Greg the Peg work for Clay and are behind the attacks and break-ins. Frankie kidnaps Nero and requests $200,000 from the club from the "cartel money." Nero hands over $130,000 in cash and a couple of "nice watches" as payment, in an effort to get Frankie to leave. Frankie shoots Opie's wife Lyla, and takes Chibs as a hostage. He eventually leaves Charming with Mafia protection and is murdered by the same men he thought would protect him, before giving up Clay as the source of the home invasions.

Kyle Hobart 
Kyle Hobart (Brian Van Holt) is excommunicated from the club after abandoning Opie during an arson job, leading to Opie's five-year incarceration. With Clay's blessing, he returns to Charming to see his teenage son, Charlie Hobart (William F. Nicol), and ends up trying to offer SAMCRO a business deal involving stolen goods to serve as repayment for his past mistake. Opie confronts Kyle and the two settle their beef, but Kyle has failed to perform the club mandate to remove his Sons of Anarchy back tattoo, so he is given a choice of removal methods ("fire or knife?"). Choosing fire, the tattoo is burned off Kyle's back with a cutting torch. He loses consciousness during the process, and it is unknown if Kyle is still alive after being left on the steps of St. Thomas Hospital, where his ex-wife, April Hobart (Liane Curtis), is waiting to aid him after being tipped off by Gemma that Kyle would likely need medical care.

Herman Kozik 
Herman Kozik (Kenny Johnson) is a member of the Tacoma chapter of the Sons of Anarchy. He first appeared in the Season 2 episode "The Culling" where he provided extra muscle when the Charming clubhouse was on lockdown. He is a former US Marine and an ex-junkie. He appeared again in the Season 3 premiere at Half-Sack's wake, where he told Clay and Bobby that he wanted to come back to the Charming chapter. When Kozik showed up at SAMCRO with transfer papers, Tig vetoed the vote due to lack of trust. Kozik then decided to stick around to earn Tig's trust. He and Piney lured the Mayans' heroin shipment into SAMCRO's hands after flattening the van's tire. Later Kozik and Tig snuck into St. Thomas to silence the Calaveras member from the drive-by as part of SAMCRO's new deal with the Mayans. Kozik has a contentious relationship with Tig and in episode 3.8, Tig states that it involves a female from both of their pasts. When Tara Knowles and Margaret Murphy are taken hostage, Kozik proves to be useful. When Salazar demands that the club kill Marcus Alvarez, Kozik is the one who convinces Alvarez to play along to help buy time so SAMCRO can find a way to get the women back. Following Tara's rescue, Tig once again votes against Kozik's transfer. It is revealed that the "woman" from both of their pasts was a female dog named Missy. In Season 4, Kozik is revealed to have been patched into SAMCRO after Tig went to Stockton Prison, a fact Tig happily accepts upon being released. He was killed in the episode "Call of Duty" by stepping on a landmine that exploded while fighting the cartel; his last words were "You gotta be shittin' me".

Eric Miles 
Eric Miles a.k.a. "Miles" (Frank Potter) is SAMCRO's newest patched-in member. He is introduced in the episode "The Push" as a prospect. Miles assists the club with tasks such as cleaning the clubhouse, providing backup when they break into Salazar's house, and watching Gemma to make sure she doesn't leave the clubhouse when she is hiding from the law. Miles is murdered by Juice to cover up what really happened with the stolen cocaine from the warehouse.

John Teller 
John Thomas 'J.T.' Teller (May 5, 1940 – November 13, 1993) (voiced by Nicholas Guest) founded the Sons of Anarchy with Piney Winston and was the club's first president. He was Gemma's first husband, and they had two children together, Jax and Thomas. Thomas "Tommy" Teller (January 8, 1984 – April 4, 1990), died from a congenital heart defect at six years of age. He also fathered an illegitimate daughter, Trinity, with Maureen Ashby during an extended sojourn in Belfast. As Jax reiterates to Opie in Season 2, episode 10 ("Balm"), J.T. died from injuries sustained from a vehicular accident while riding on I-580 in California. Gemma states in an earlier episode and is shown in a Charming Police Department report in Season 4, Episode 2 ("Booster"): after J.T.'s Harley was "sideswiped" by a semi-trailer truck on November 11, 1993, at 13:54; J.T. was dragged 178 yards, taken to St. Thomas Hospital, and died two days later. His home address on the police report is 8824 Sandy Creek in Charming, California. Deputy Chief Wayne Unser signed the report. In Season 4, Episode 5 ("Brick"), Unser says Clay killed J.T. and had Unser cover it up; Clay responds he merely asked Unser to "lose a little paperwork". Unser retorts that J.T. had written that Clay would make two attempts on his life. In Season 7, Episode 8 ("Separation of Crows") Jury White says J.T. committed suicide out of guilt for letting SAMCRO become corrupt and deliberately crashed into the semi-trailer, an act of self-sacrifice to protect his club and family from his mistakes. Several times in Season 7, SAMCRO members are seen touching the roadside memorial dedicated to J.T. (e.g., in episode 7 "Greensleeves" and episode 13 "Papa's Goods").

Rane Quinn 
Rane Quinn (Rusty Coones) is the former president of the Nomad Charter. He appears in Season 5 to help track down one of his former Nomad soldiers. He becomes a member of the Redwood Original charter.

Allesandro Montez 
Allesandro 'Domingo' Montez (Jacob Vargas) is a member of the Sons of Anarchy Motorcycle Club's Reno, NV chapter and later a member of SAMCRO.

T.O. Cross 
Taddarius Orwell 'T.O.' Cross (Michael Beach) is the former president of the Grim Bastards Motorcycle Club. He is voted in as full member of SAMCRO in the series finale, after Jax makes a pact with the other SOA clubs to abolish the unwritten bylaw prohibiting blacks as members, and the Grim Bastards are patched over.

Leonard Janowitz 
Leonard 'Lenny the Pimp' Janowitz (Sonny Barger, a founding member of the Oakland, California chapter of Hells Angels Motorcycle Club). He appeared in episodes of the third, fourth and fifth seasons, and was convicted and jailed for murdering three ATF agents.
 He was also one of the first nine original members, the third person to join.

Otto Delaney 

Otto 'Big Otto' Delaney (Kurt Sutter, creator of the series) was a member of the Sons of Anarchy's Charming chapter. He was imprisoned in Stockton state prison on charges of second-degree murder and vehicle theft, but is still in contact with the club. He is a powerful man on the inside and is the leader of the "Big House Crew", a gang of imprisoned Sons of Anarchy members. He takes Chucky Marstein under his protection, and arranges, when Chucky is released, to have SAMCRO protect him from Lin. In Season 2, Zobelle has the Aryan Brotherhood severely beat Otto, to "humble" Clay, and in the process the AB puts out Otto's one good eye, leaving him almost blind. Also that season, Otto is heartbroken when Luann is murdered. In Season 6, U.S. Marshal Lee Toric targets Otto, in retaliation for Otto's having killed Toric's sister, and has Otto repeatedly raped and beaten in prison. Clay smuggles Otto a shank, which Otto uses to kill Toric and then to threaten the guards, in order to commit "suicide by cop".

Filthy Phil

Phillip 'Filthy Phil' Russell (Christopher Douglas Reed) was one of three new prospects taken on after the death of Kip "Half Sack" Epps. Phil is responsible for guarding the first shipment of cocaine the club receives from the Galindo cartel along with Miles, new prospect Ratboy and Rafi from the Mayans Oakland Chapter. When some of the shipment is stolen, Phil and the other guards are the main suspects despite Juice being the true culprit. Prior to the fifth season, Phil was voted in to be an official member of SAMCRO. In season six, Phil is killed by the IRA.

SOA Indian Hills members

Jury White 
'Jury' White (Michael Shamus Wiles) is the former president of the friendly Devil's Tribe Motorcycle Club in Indian Hills, Nevada, which SAMCRO patched over without prior warning in Season 1. Jury and John Teller ("J.T.") had served together in the same platoon in Vietnam and remained close friends afterwards. In season 7, SAMCRO called upon "Indian Hills", and in turn Jury recruited "local muscle", to help take down Lin's gun buy (which turned out to include an exchange of guns for heroin) in Selma, and kill Lin's men and customers. Jax, Chibs, and Bobby later killed the "local muscle", and framed them for the takedown in Selma. When Jax later learns one of the murdered "local muscle", Gib O'Leary, was Jury's son, Jax erroneously assumes Jury took revenge by ratting out SAMCRO to Lin. In season 7, episode 8 ("Separation of Crows"), Jury tells Jax that his father didn't die as rumored, in a motorcycle accident resulting from Clay's having sabotaged his bike (on which John died days after colliding with and being dragged by a semi truck). Rather, Jury said, J.T. deliberately "checked out" (committed suicide), as "That Panhead was an extension of John. He would have known if anything was wrong with it the second he kicked it over. [...] Maybe it was his sacrifice. A way of letting his club and family survive." Jax disagreed, saying: "My old man didn't kill himself." After exchanging further words, Jax knocked down Jury, who dropped his gun. When Jury reached for and grabbed it, Jax killed him with a single shot to the head. That action, witnessed by Jury's VP and  SAMCRO members, and Jax's confession to it, led to Jax's receiving a unanimous Mayhem vote in the series finale ("Papa's Goods").

Needles 
'Needles' (Jay Thames) is vice president of the Devil's Tribe Motorcycle Club chapter. He follows Jury in patching over into a Sons of Anarchy chapter.

Hopper 
Hopper (Steve Howey) is a Sons of Anarchy North Vegas charter member. He is approached by Bobby Munson to join SAMCRO and says he wants in, but changes his mind after being scared off by the bombing of the SAMCRO clubhouse.

Other Indian Hills Members

Sometime after the events of season one, Needles is no longer the VP of the Indian Hills charter and has been replaced by Gaines. Gaines is voted in as the charter's president after Jury is killed. Mickey is then voted in as Gaines' new VP.

SAMBEL members

Keith McGee

Keith McGee (Andy McPhee) was the president of the Sons of Anarchy Belfast chapter (SAMBEL) in Northern Ireland and a member of the First 9.

Liam O'Neill 
Liam O'Neill (Arie Verveen) was the Sergeant-At-Arms of the Belfast charter of the Sons of Anarchy for 10 years and was in a relationship with Cherry.

Seamus Ryan 
Seamus Ryan (Darin Heames) is the current president of SAMBEL. McGee was the original SAMBEL president and Ryan was the SAMBEL vice president during the betrayals and executions of McGee and Sergeant-at-Arms Liam O'Neill. After McGee and O'Neill are executed, Ryan is tapped as president.

Luther Barkwill 
Luther Barkwill (Dominic Keating), is the current vice president of SAMBEL. He was the road captain for the SOA Sunderland, Tyne and Wear chapter and eventually for SAMBEL. Although hesitant at times, he is a quick reactor. An example includes him being hesitant to run the police off the road to prevent them from hauling off SAMCRO, but after Gemma jumped on the accelerator and ran them off the road, Luther jumped out and started firing rapidly.

Padraic Telford 
Padraic Telford (Lorcan O'Toole), Chibs' nephew, was accidentally killed in an explosion triggered by Liam O'Neill in an attempt to take out SAMCRO.

Minor SAMBEL members
Following SAMCRO's arrival in Ireland, in an attempt to bring back Abel, several additional members of the Belfast chapter have appeared on the scene, including  'Geezer' (Jason McDonald), and 'Scrum' (Darren Keefe).

SAMTAZ members

Armando 
Armando (Lobo Sebastian), president of the Sons of Anarchy Tucson chapter (SAMTAZ) in Tucson, Arizona, was beheaded by a cartel. The rest of his body was discovered in the back of a truck by the Sons of Anarchy and the Mayans, and his body was sent back to his club in Tucson, along with his head.

Benny 
Benny (Rolando Molina), the Sergeant-at-Arms for the Tucson chapter, was kicked out with vice president Huff for blackmailing a fellow member, Reggie, and murdering another member in order to cover up a non-club-sanctioned meth cook shop.

Huff 
Huff (Brian Goodman), the vice president of the Tucson chapter, was kicked out for blackmailing a fellow member, 
Reggie, and murdering another member in order to cover up a non-club-sanctioned meth cook shop.

Reggie 
Reggie (John Bishop), a member of the Sons of Anarchy Tucson chapter (SAMTAZ) in Tucson, Arizona, was caught by former vice president Huff sleeping with another member's wife. Huff used this information to blackmail Reggie in order to cover up a non-club-sanctioned meth cook shop and the murder of another member, who happened to be Reggie's sponsor.

Minor SAMTAZ members
Paul 'Little Paul', a SAMTAZ member, was murdered by Huff and Benny. Another yet-to-be-named member has also appeared, played by Burton Perez.

SAMDINO members
The Sons of Anarchy San Bernardino chapter (SAMDINO) is led by president Les Packer (Robert Patrick), while John Hensley portrayed Yates – the two actors having previously played father and son, David and Eric Scatino, in The Sopranos.

Tacoma chapter members
The Tacoma chapter's president is Lee (Lee "Hamco" Staskunas), while other, still unseen, members include 'Bowie', 'Donut',  and Lorca.

Additional chapters and members
The yet-to-be-named president of the Oregon chapter (Joe Rose) has made one appearance, as well as a yet-to-be-named nomad member (Eric "Mancow" Muller).

SAMCRO women

Lyla Winston 
Lyla Dvorak-Winston (Winter Ave Zoli), a porn star employed by Luann Delaney, is introduced in Season 1. She and Opie begin to grow close from the time they meet. A single parent like Opie, she helps him with his children and marries him in the first episode of Season 4. After Opie's death, she continues to raise his children and goes on to run Red Woody in Season 7.

Fiona Larkin 
Fiona Larkin (Bellina Logan) is Chibs' estranged wife, introduced in Season 2. Fiona first appears at Chibs' bedside when he is hospitalized after nearly being killed by a car bomb. They have a daughter together, and Fiona still loves Chibs, but was taken as Jimmy O's prize after Jimmy banished Chibs from Ireland.

Precious Ryan 
Precious Ryan (Eileen Grubba) is Bobby's ex-wife and mother of his son.

Rita 'Cherry' Zambell 
Rita 'Cherry' Zambell (Taryn Manning) is a "sweetbutt" (pass around club groupie) from Indian Hills, Nevada, whose real name is Rita Zambell. After leaving her abusive husband and burning down their condo, she aligns herself with the Devil's Tribe. She bonds with Kip "Half-Sack" Epps and eventually becomes his old lady, but SAMCRO sends her to Canada, then Ireland, to escape arrest for arson. She becomes Liam's lover in Ireland.

Mary Winston 
Mary Winston (Julie Ariola) is Piney Winston's ex-wife and Opie's mother. She moved away from Charming, leaving Opie with Piney and then filed for divorce. However, she returns to temporarily look after her grandchildren when Opie is arrested. She consoles the distraught Opie after Donna's murder.

Luann Delaney 
Luann Delaney (Dendrie Taylor) is Gemma's best friend and runs a pornography studio, CaraCara, having received financial backing from Big Otto, her husband. She reluctantly partners with SAMCRO for protection, after her rival Georgie Caruso makes escalating attacks on her business. She begins a sexual relationship with Bobby Munson to buy his silence, after he discovers she has been skimming money from the CaraCara partnership. Ultimately, Georgie has her killed, which devastates Otto.

Donna Winston 
Donna Lerner-Winston (Sprague Grayden) is Opie's first wife and the mother of his two children. She doesn't trust SAMCRO after Opie serves extensive jail time for the club. She is mistakenly murdered by Tig in the Season 1 finale.

SAMCRO children

Kerrianne Telford 
Kerrianne Larkin-Telford (Q'orianka Kilcher) is the teenage daughter of Chibs Telford and Fiona Larkin, raised by Fiona and Jimmy O'Phelan.

Abel Teller 
Abel Teller (Ryder and Evan Londo) is the son of Jax Teller and Wendy Case. Abel was hospitalized as a newborn due to his premature birth and his mother's drug usage. He was kidnapped by Cameron Hayes in the season 2 finale episode Na Triobloidi, then was put into an adoption of where he was adopted by a catholic Irish family. Jax gets Abel back from the family after they were murdered.

Thomas Teller 
Thomas 'Tommy' Teller (multiple actors) is the son of Jax Teller and Tara Knowles. The younger half-brother of Abel Teller, Thomas is named after Jax's brother and Gemma's second son who died as a child.

Dawn & Fawn Trager 
Dawn 'Margeoux' Trager (Rachel Miner) and Fawn Trager (Lexi Sakowitz) are the daughters of Alex "Tig" Trager and his ex-wife Colleen. Dawn first appears in the episode "With An X." Dawn is burned to death in the season 5 episode Authority Vested in front of Tig by Damon Pope as retaliation for Tig killing his daughter.

Ellie & Kenny Winston 
Ellie and Kenny Winston (Lela Jane Cortines and John Abendroth) are the daughter and son of Opie and Donna Winston.

Law enforcement

Agent Estevez 
Agent Estevez (Marcos de la Cruz) is an agent of the Department of Justice, working under Agent Stahl to bring SAMCRO down.

Deputy David Hale 

Deputy David Hale (Taylor Sheridan) is the deputy chief of the Charming Police Department. Chief Unser nicknames him "Captain America" for his black-and-white views and squeaky clean image (prior to his involvement with L.O.A.N. and sexual encounter with an ATF agent), adherence to the law and, possibly, because of his square-jawed all-American looks. Hale is murdered at Half-Sack's wake while trying to stop the van of shooters.

Lieutenant Althea Jarry 
Lieutenant Althea Jarry (Annabeth Gish) is the Lieutenant of the San Joaquin Sheriff Department, who is sent to replace the late Eli Roosevelt after his murder. Unser becomes her consultant and helps out in Tara's murder case. Jarry is also shown to have an attraction to SAMCRO member Chibs Telford, which is mutual as they are shown kissing and even sleeping together. She accepts bribe money from the club as a means to earn their trust and establish a working relationship.

Agent Josh Kohn 
Agent Joshua 'Josh' Kohn (Jay Karnes) is a Bureau of Alcohol, Tobacco, Firearms and Explosives agent pretending to investigate SAMCRO. He and Dr. Tara Knowles dated in Chicago until he became threatening and she obtained a restraining order against him. He later stalks Tara in Charming becoming increasingly violent and unhinged. This culminates in him trying to rape Tara, who shoots him in the gut. Tara calls Jax because she doesn't know what to do with the bleeding out Kohn, and when he insults Tara, Jax kills him. The Santa Rosa Press Democrat called the character "terrifically creepy."

Agent Grad Nicholas 
Agent Grad Nicholas (David Rees Snell) is an FBI agent assigned to investigate the SAMCRO's arms trafficking business. He works closely with Assistant U.S. Attorney Lincoln Potter, often by his side during various points in the investigation. The character's name is a reference to FX network executive Nicholas Grad.

DA Tyne Patterson 
District Attorney Tyne Patterson (C. C. H. Pounder) is the San Joaquin County District Attorney from Stockton assigned to aggressively address the violence plaguing Charming, specifically from a school shooting resulting in the deaths of four children using a gun acquired from the Sons of Anarchy motorcycle club. To do so, she works with former U.S. Marshal Lee Toric to investigate the Sons.

US Attorney Lincoln Potter 
Lincoln 'Linc' Potter (Ray McKinnon), who in Season 4, Episode 2 says he is a Modesto, California native, an eccentric, manipulative assistant U.S. attorney operating out of Charming in Season 4 and the head of a joint agency task force targeting the Sons of Anarchy's arms trafficking business under the Racketeer Influenced and Corrupt Organizations Act, as well as the Real IRA and the Galindo cartel. He rides a motorcycle, dresses like a biker, and somewhat resembles John Teller, which causes Gemma to ask Lincoln if she knows him. Lincoln disapproves of Hale's conflict of interest as both a real estate developer and local government representative, and in the Season 4 finale produces evidence at the Charming city council meeting about Hale's investor that kiboshes Hale's proposed luxury real estate project.

Lieutenant Eli Roosevelt 
Lieutenant Eli Roosevelt (Rockmond Dunbar) is a member of the San Joaquin County Sheriff's Department and the head of Charming's law enforcement following the dissolution of the Charming Police Department. Prior to his assignment in Charming, he spent 15 years in Oakland working as part of an anti-gang task force. In the Season 6 finale, Eli finds Tara's corpse and, while he's chastising Gemma, Juice shoots him dead to protect Gemma. In Season 4, Episode 2 Eli's wife is shown to have fertility problems, and in later episodes that season she helps Gemma, who visits her flower shop for assistance with wilting plants, successfully solicits a $5,000 "Gold Circle Club" donation from Gemma (donated in Tara's name), and receives a $75,000 joint donation from Clay and Oswalt, to save the community garden where Gemma's father taught Gemma to plant seeds. Later in the series Eli's wife is murdered by men Clay hired to scare the town.

Agent Smith 
Agent Smith (Derwin Jordan) is Agent Stahl's ATF partner during the first season.

Agent June Stahl 
Agent June Stahl (Ally Walker) is an ATF agent investigating the club's involvement in arms trafficking after Deputy Chief Hale calls in the ATF in retaliation when Chief Unser does not retire as previously expected. Stahl is responsible for the death of Donna Winston, Opie's wife, when she frames him as a rat to Clay. Later Stahl attempts to frame Chibs. Stahl and Jax make an agreement to get Gemma out of her charges, (that happened when Stahl framed her murder) and for a lighter sentence for the members of SAMCRO. Stahl is killed at the end of season 3, by Opie who tells her, "put your hands on the wheel. This is what she felt", referring to the moment his wife (who Tig thought was Opie) was mistakenly gunned down and shot in the back of the head, all because of her lies in framing Opie as a rat to Clay.

Sheriff Vic Trammel 
Sheriff Victor 'Vic' Trammel (Glenn Plummer) was the local sheriff, and an ally of SAMCRO. A close friend of his is murdered by survivalists using guns provided by the Sons, prompting Vic to seriously question his ties to the club.

Agent Amy Tyler 
Amy Tyler (Pamela J. Gray) is an ATF agent who is both June Stahl's professional and personal partner during the third season.

Lee Toric 
Lee Toric (Donal Logue) is a former U.S. Marshal forced into retirement for a variety of reasons, including excessive use of force and racial profiling. It is also mentioned that Toric served in the U.S. Army Special Forces prior to his Marshal service. His only family is his sister Pamela Toric, who works as a nurse at Stockton prison's infirmary. When she is killed by former SAMCRO member Otto Delaney to end the RICO case facing the club, Toric vows revenge. Toric has Otto repeatedly beaten up and raped in prison, hoping to force him into confessing against SAMCRO (as well as satisfying his vengeance for Pamela) and even takes Clay to see the injured Otto in the prison infirmary, though Clay slips Otto a shiv. Believing his tactics are working and he has convinced Otto to bring down SAMCRO, he instead finds a vulgar message about Pamela written on the notepad, prompting him to attack Otto. Otto stabs him multiple times with the shiv and finally slits his throat as the prison guards arrive.

Charles Barosky 
Charles 'Charlie' Barosky (Peter Weller) is a corrupt former police officer who still has ties with the local police agency and controls rackets in Stockton. He makes numerous deals with people to provide police protection for money. His main operation center is a bakery he owns in Stockton.

Real IRA members and associates

Father Kellan Ashby 
Father Kellan Ashby (James Cosmo) is the consigliere of the Real IRA in Belfast.

Maureen Ashby 
Maureen Ashby (Paula Malcomson) is the widow of Keith McGee. She has ties to the SOA through her late husband and ties to the Real IRA through her older brother, Father Kellan Ashby.

Trinity Ashby 
Trinity Ashby (Zoe Boyle) is Maureen Ashby's adult daughter and McGee's stepdaughter. Her mother Maureen was 18 when she gave birth to Trinity, who is unaware that John Teller, the founder of the Sons of Anarchy, was her real father, and therefore, Jackson (Jax) Teller her half-brother, And Thomas Teller would be her half brother too. 

She is also the aunt of Thomas and Abel.

Brogan, Dooley & Roarke 
Declan Brogan (Bart McCarthy), Peter Dooley (Paul Collins) and Brendan Roarke (Bob McCracken) are the council of the Real IRA in Belfast. First seen thanking SAMCRO for proving Jimmy O. to have gone rogue, they later propose developing the relationship between the Sons and True IRA even further.

Sean & Michael Casey 
Brothers Sean and Michael Casey (Dan Hildebrand and Glenn Keogh) are members of the Real IRA in Belfast, and very close to Father Ashby. Maureen Ashby describes them as "being like sons to him." Following Father Ashby's order, they kill Cameron Hayes and dispose of his body. Michael is slain by Jimmy O., who attacks Maureen Ashby's home when the SOA are on a protection run in the episode "Turas".

Donny 
Donny (Joel Tobeck) is Jimmy's right-hand man in Belfast. He is a man of reason that tries to keep Jimmy's wild tendencies under control. He successfully tortures Sean Casey for information about Abel Teller.

Cameron Hayes 
Cameron Hayes (Jamie McShane) is McKeavey's cousin and a member of the Real IRA. He becomes SAMCRO's new contact and gun runner after McKeavey's death. Cameron gives back the $200,000 SAMCRO paid for a gun shipment in addition to a month of free guns, as payment for killing Oakland Port Authority Commissioner Brenan Hefner.

Edmond Hayes 
Edmond Hayes (Callard Harris) is Cameron Hayes' son and business partner. He is from South Armagh. Throughout Season 2, he has as much clout in the business as his father, often making deals and judgment calls on his own. Edmond becomes a rat and is later killed by Agent June Stahl when he starts to run, after punching her in abdomen when she says his father, "da raised an Irish pussy". Edmond's death is framed on Gemma, by Agent Stahl, after she follows Polly inside, and kills her in self-defense, just after Stahl kills Edmond.

Michael McKeavey 
Michael McKeavey (Kevin Chapman) is a powerful member of the True IRA who serves as SAMCRO's contact and helps sell illegal weapons through the Sons of Anarchy. His date of birth was April 1, 1966. McKeavey is an old friend to SAMCRO members, including Clay and Piney.

Luke Moran 
Luke Moran (Kevin P. Kearns) is Jimmy O.'s second in command in the U.S., and he is glad to follow his boss' every order. When Jax finds out that Jimmy has been lying to him about Abel's whereabouts, he kidnaps Luke and delivers him to Agent June Stahl as part of his deal with her.

James O'Phelan

James 'Jimmy O' O'Phelan (Titus Welliver) is the leader of the Real IRA group who sells guns to SAMCRO. Jimmy O. makes his first appearance in Season 2 to personally rectify the Hayes' betrayal of SAMCRO, since the Real IRA has long been dependent on the Sons Of Anarchy's Belfast chapter. Jimmy is generally regarded as Chibs Telford's archenemy. When the real IRA have proof of him going behind their backs, he takes Jax's son, Abel, to exchange for a safe passage back to the US. After a long hunt and search, SAMCRO finds out the Russians are hiding him. SAMCRO makes a deal to hand Jimmy over to them. When Agent Stahl gets custody of Jimmy from SAMCRO, Chief Unser pulls them over with a ruse about Jimmy's members waiting ahead in a road block for them. With Stahl's other agents gone, Chibs and a few other members of SAMCRO show up by bus. Chibs pulls Jimmy O. out of the car and slices his mouth, (in the same manner as Jimmy did him years before) and then stabs him to death.

Galen O'Shay 
Galen O'Shay (Timothy V. Murphy) is a high-ranking member of the Real IRA, directly involved in SAMCRO's affairs with the Galindo Cartel. He views Jax as impulsive and reckless following an incident stateside and holds him responsible for the death of Father Kellan Ashby. Cutthroat, stubborn, and ruthless, Galen has no remorse for killing anybody who gets in the way of his business arrangements; for example, he has two members of SAMCRO killed to simply send a message after Jax announces his intention to move away from the gun business. Upon breaking Clay out of prison, Galen is shot dead by Jax.

Rival MC members

Esai Alvarez 
Esai Alvarez (Kevin Alejandro) is a member of the Mayans Motorcycle Club and the son of Marcus Alvarez. Marcus selects his son to perform hits on both the Nords' leader Ernest Darby and SAMCRO leader Clay Morrow, but Esai and his men botch both hits. Esai was killed by Happy (with his father's approval) shortly afterwards, in a deal to achieve peace with the Nords and SAMCRO.

Lander Jackson 
Lander Jackson (Marcello Thedford) is the vice president of the Grim Bastards Motorcycle Club. He and T.O. had been childhood friends, since age four. He is brutally killed by Edgar, the Sergeant-at-Arms of the rival Calaveras Motorcycle Club; T.O. later kills Edgar in revenge.

Roscoe 
Roscoe (Joseph Julian Soria) is a member of the Calaveras Motorcycle Club Lodi chapter. He is appointed the new president by Marcus Álvarez, following the removal of Hector Salazar.

Hector Salazar 
Hector Salazar (Jose Pablo Cantillo) is the former president of the Lodi chapter of the Calaveras Motorcycle Club, a low-ranking club that does dirty work for the Mayans. The Calaveras perform the drive-by at Half-Sack's wake. He kidnaps Tara and Margaret Murphy and holds them hostage in his aunt's house. This eventually leads to his death by Jax Teller.

Gang members

Jimmy Cacuzza 
James 'Jimmy' Cacuzza (Jeff Wincott) is the boss of a  Mafia family and a friend of Clay's. He and his crew buy weapons from SAMCRO. When the Mayans and Nords blow up SAMCRO's warehouse, delaying SAMCRO's delivery of one of the weapons shipments, SAMCRO hijacks one of Unser's trucks and gives the contents to the Mafia, taking only a 10% return, as a goodwill gesture.

Ernest Darby 
Ernest Darby (Mitch Pileggi) is the head of the Nordics (also known as "Nords"), a white supremacist gang mainly involved in meth trafficking. Darby colludes, at various points, with Alvarez, L.O.A.N., and Hale to discredit and eliminate SAMCRO, to bring drugs into Charming, and to burn down CaraCara. He also, initially, accepts money from Hale to persuade Lumpy to sell his boxing club but refuses to use violence and returns the money.

Henry Lin 
Henry Lin (Kenneth Choi) was the Chinese-American leader of an Oakland-based Triad. His gang is after a man named Chuck Marstein, who was a bookkeeper for their illegal businesses but eventually stole from them. In season 7, he was killed by Juice.

Nate Meineke 
Nate Meineke (Tim De Zarn) is the leader of a local state militia and terrorist group. He served in Vietnam alongside Piney Winston. He and his son, Russell Meineke (James Harvey Ward), buy weapons from SAMCRO and use them to ambush a prison convoy to free one of their members. They plan to go into hiding in Mexico. However, the Sons of Anarchy kill them by bombing their hideout bunker, as they had brought heat onto SAMCRO with the shootings.

Romero Parada 
Romero 'Romeo' Parada (Danny Trejo) is a high-ranking member of the Galindo drug cartel, who has connections to Marcus Alvarez and the Mayans. He is a former Mexican commando that was enlisted by José Galindo to head up the cartel's strategic enforcement unit. At the end of season 4 it is revealed that he and his lieutenant Luis Torres are NCS members working with the CIA to take down rival drug cartels and thus control the Mexican drug trade and stabilize Mexico. Parada and the CIA shut down the RICO case against SAMCRO at the end of season 4 and force Jax to take over leadership of SAMCRO and keep Clay alive to continue the gunrunning operation.

Damon Pope 
Damon Pope (Harold Perrineau) is first mentioned in Season 4's finale as the most dangerous gangster in Oakland. A powerful businessman, Damon Pope is also a bloodthirsty, ruthless, and calculating individual who wields influence over many black gangs. He does not hesitate to use extreme violence to demonstrate his power or to make things go his way. After Tig inadvertently kills Pope's daughter by hitting her with a car aimed at Laroy, Pope orders his henchmen to burn one of Tig's daughters alive in front of her father. Later, Pope forces SAMCRO to work for him; however, Jax eventually outsmarts him and tricks Pope to meet in a remote area by promising to give up Tig, whom at Jax's request, Pope agreed to delay killing. After killing Pope's guards who did not expect an attack, Jax gives a gun to Tig, who shoots Pope in the head.

August Marks 
August Marks (Billy Brown), introduced in Season 5, is Damon Pope's right-hand man. Like Pope, Marks projects a courteous and friendly front, but is also extremely ruthless. He states he has been working for Pope since he was 17. He also tells Jax what separates him from Pope is that "Damon made his name on the streets by being the smartest. I (August) made mine by being the deadliest." In the series finale, Jax shoots him dead in revenge for Bobby's murder.

Viktor Putlova 
Viktor Putlova (Keith Szarabajka) the head of the  Russian Mafia in Northern California and Oregon. An old acquaintance of Jimmy O.'s, Putlova is hired by Jimmy to help him escape the Real IRA and SAMCRO. However, Putlova betrays Jimmy and makes a deal with SAMCRO to hand over Jimmy in exchange for $2 million.

Luis Torres 
Luis Torres (Benito Martinez) is Romeo Parada's chief lieutenant in the Jose Galindo drug cartel. He is often at Romeo's side. He is a former lieutenant first class in the Mexican Special Forces Airmobile Group and Intelligence. He has a master's degree in logistics from Universidad Veracruzana. Parada was his commanding officer and Torres left Special Forces two weeks after Parada left. Torres' last known tour of duty was fighting the Galindo Cartel. Like Parada, Torres was recruited into NCS working with the CIA to fight rival drug cartels and thus control the Mexican drug trade and stabilize Mexico.

Ron Tully 
Ron Tully (Marilyn Manson) is the leader of the Aryan Brotherhood in the Stockton, California area. He is currently incarcerated in Stockton State prison, where he has great influence as many guards are on his payroll. He becomes an ally to Jax and SAMCRO in Season 7, after Jax viciously beats an AB rat and brings Tully two of the rat's teeth. Tully develops a sexual interest in Juice, who gets himself arrested purposely so he can kill Lin, after which Tully is charged by SAMCRO to assassinate Juice.

Ule 
Ule (Jason Matthew Smith) is a member of the League of American Nationals (L.O.A.N.). He has an antagonistic and distrustful relationship with A.J. Weston, and believes that, as Zobelle's right-hand man, Weston's ardent white supremacist beliefs are not allowing L.O.A.N. to broaden their horizons. Gradually, Ule takes Weston's place in L.O.A.N.'s covert activities with the Mayans. When A.J. Weston finds out about the drug trade with the Mayans, he kills the female heroin cookers and executes Ule.

Laroy Wayne 
Laroy Wayne (Tory Kittles) is SAMCRO's contact in the One-Niners street gang and the gang's leader. Laroy buys weapons from SAMCRO and is often in the company of a man with a burned face called Gill (E.R. Ruiz), possibly his second in command. The fictional One-Niners gang also appears in The Shield. Laroy ends up dead when his body ends up in Damon Pope's fire pit that Tig is made to watch go up in flames, as it also contains his daughter, Dawn, as retaliation for the death of Pope's daughter.

A.J. Weston 
A.J. Weston (Henry Rollins) is the muscle, or street leader, of the League of American Nationalists (also known as "L.O.A.N."), a white separatist gang trying to gain control in Charming and force SAMCRO out. A lieutenant and right-hand man of Ethan Zobelle, A.J is an extremely violent ex-convict and ardent white supremacist, albeit also being a loving single father of two young sons, Cliff and Duke. Zobelle and Weston threaten SAMCRO' 's President, Clay Morrow, but when he proves impossible to intimidate, Weston and two other Aryans wearing rubber masks kidnap his wife, Gemma Teller Morrow. They chain her to a fence, beat her, and gang rape her. Weston is eventually killed when SAMCRO ambushes him the bathroom of a tattoo parlor. Weston's son Cliff is present, but Weston convinces Jax teller to allow the child to leave before Jax shoots Weston six times with a silenced pistol, killing him.

IGN gave the second season an 8.4/10 rating, giving praise to Henry Rollins' character, AJ Weston, saying, "A decidedly stronger second season sees the gang unravel and knit back together." His death was voted #2 on IGN's list of Sons of Anarchys Best Deaths ahead of the airing of the show's third season.

 Ethan Zobelle Ethan Zobelle (Adam Arkin) is the head of the League of American Nationalists ("L.O.A.N."), a white separatist gang who desires to gain a foothold in Charming and force SAMCRO out. Zobelle moved into Charming and presented himself to the townspeople and local law enforcement as the owner of the newly opened Impeccable Smokes cigar shop on the town's Main Street. Zobelle presented himself to Deputy Chief David Hale as being a means to get SAMCRO out of Charming. After Zobelle makes several unsuccessful attempts to remove SAMCRO from Charming, SAMCRO bikers convince Zobelle's right-hand man A.J. Weston that Zobelle was working behind the brotherhood's back by dealing in the gun and heroin trades with the Mayans. It is eventually revealed Zobelle is an F.B.I. informant, and he and his daughter Polly attempt to flee to Budapest. Polly is killed, but Zobelle escapes, and is last seen booking a flight out of a small private airport.

 Polly Zobelle Polly Zobelle (Sarah Jones) is the scheming daughter and accomplice of Ethan Zobelle. She is the one who initially tricks and subdues Gemma prior to her rape. She also rigs the car bomb which nearly kills Chibs. Deputy Hale extorts her to get information about her father's whereabouts, but she feeds him partially false information, which has extreme repercussions for SAMCRO. She is shot dead by Gemma in retaliation for having her raped.

SAMCRO's lawyers (Robin Weigert) is a colleague of Rosen's and SAMCRO's new legal counsel as of Season 3. (Tom Everett Scott) is the club's lawyer, who Clay says bills $1,200 an hour. His connection to the club may be at least somewhat personal as well as professional. 

Miscellaneous (Stephen King) is an independent biker and the "cleaner" Tig hires to dispose of the body of Nate's slain caretaker, Amelia Dominguez. The name "Bachman" is a reference to Stephen King's pen name Richard Bachman. (Tom Arnold) is a rival of Luann Delaney in the pornography business. (Monique Gabriela Curnen) is Nate Madock's caretaker. Amelia is an illegal immigrant from Guatemala, with no family in the United States. (David Hasselhoff) is a former pornstar-turned-director, whom Lyla works for after working for Luann Delaney. Luann was his mentor. (Michael Fairman) is a local boxing club owner, a Holocaust survivor, and a close friend of SAMCRO's. (James Carraway) is the town barber in Charming, and his shop is a neutral meeting place for law enforcement and SAMCRO members. (Jeff Kober) is a businessman and local politician, and the older brother of Deputy Chief David Hale. (Keir O'Donnell) is a second-generation mechanic at Teller-Morrow Automotive Repair and a drug addict. (Lyle Kanouse) is the Oakland Port Commissioner. (Randolph Mantooth), the chief of the Wahewa Native American tribe, which manufactures ammunition for the Sons of Anarchy Motorcycle Club. He officiated at Lyla and Opie's wedding, which was held on the reservation. (Hal Holbrook) is Gemma's elderly father and a former church pastor. He taught Gemma how to plant seeds at Charming's community garden, which inspires Gemma to contribute $5,000 (in Tara's name) to Lt. Eli's wife's fundraiser to save the garden from being destroyed by Hale's real estate project. Nate has dementia, and Gemma helps him move into the nursing home his wife Rose had selected before she died from cancer. The house he and Rose owned, and the nursing home he is moved to are both near Rogue River, Oregon. (Michael Marisi Ornstein), a prison friend of Otto's, was a bookkeeper and counterfeiter for a Triad gang, and later the bookkeeper for CaraCara. He becomes a "Guy Friday" for Gemma and the club. (Ashley Monique Clark), the 17-year-old neighbor of Brenan Hefner's mistress, witnesses Brenan's murder. (Michael Chiklis) is a truck driver from Northern California who befriends Gemma in Season 7. (McNally Sagal; Katey's sister in law) is an administrator at St. Thomas Hospital; she disapproves of Tara's relationship with Jax and the Sons of Anarchy, but later proves to be a great support to Tara. (Cleo King) becomes Abel's babysitter during Season 2. Following Abel's kidnapping, she has not reappeared on the show. (Patrick St. Esprit) is a prominent businessman and ranch owner in Charming. He claims his family has been in Charming longer than SAMCRO and that he has trouble getting along with SAMCRO, although he seeks out Clay's help when Oswald's daughter disappears at a carnival and is later found to have been raped by a carny. From that point on, Oswald becomes a go-to person for the club, and in turn, the club helps him avoid being taken advantage of by Hale and Zobelle's "eminent domain" scam. (Bob Rusch), is a gravedigger and cremator for Dubrowski's Funeral Home. He assists SAMCRO by providing cadavers and body parts. (Kristen Renton), introduced in Season 2, is a porn star employed by Luann Delaney.' (Walton Goggins), is a transgender prostitute born Vincent Noone. Venus and the club help each other on several occasions and she becomes romantically involved with Tig. She has a son from before her transition that believes she is his aunt instead of his parent. She enlists the club's help to save her son from her mother because her mother is creating child pornography involving him.

References

External links 
 

Sons of Anarchy
Sons of Anarchy